The first season of Chicago Med, an American medical drama television series with executive producer Dick Wolf, and producers Michael Brandt, Peter Jankowski, Andrew Schneider and René Balcer The first season premiered on November 17, 2015 and concluded on May 17, 2016. The season contained 18 episodes.

Plot
Chicago Med focuses on the emergency department at Gaffney Chicago Medical Center and on its doctors and nurses as they work to save patients' lives.

Cast

Main
 Nick Gehlfuss as Dr. Will Halstead, Chief Resident
 Torrey DeVitto as Dr. Natalie Manning
 Yaya DaCosta as April Sexton
 Rachel DiPillo as Sarah Reese
 Colin Donnell as Dr. Connor Rhodes
 Brian Tee as LCDR Dr. Ethan Choi
 S. Epatha Merkerson as Sharon Goodwin, Chief of Services
 Oliver Platt as Dr. Daniel Charles
 Marlyne Barrett as Maggie Lockwood, RN, ED Charge Nurse

Recurring
 Julie Berman as Dr. Samantha "Sam" Zanetti
 Brennan Brown as Dr. Sam Abrams
 Peter Mark Kendall as Joey Thomas
 D. W. Moffett as Cornelius Rhodes
 Christina Brucato as Claire Rhodes
 Annie Potts as Helen Manning
 Gregg Henry as Dr. David Downey
 Susie Abromeit as Zoe Roth
 Roland Buck III as Noah Sexton
 Marc Grapey as Peter Kalmick
 Cynthia Addai-Robinson as Dr. Vicki Glass
 Lorena Diaz as Nurse Doris
Amanda Marcheschi as Nurse Dina
 Patti Murin as Dr. Nina Shore

Guest
 Jeff Hephner as Jeff Clarke

Crossover characters

Episodes

Production
The series was greenlighted by NBC for the show's pilot episode on May 1, 2015.

Casting
Laurie Holden was originally cast as Dr. Hannah Tramble, but dropped out due to "family reasons". On May 29, 2015, Arrow star Colin Donnell was cast as Dr. Connor Rhodes, the hospital's newest ED physician. In July 2015, Brian Tee joined the cast as Dr. Ethan Choi, an expert in infectious disease prevention and a Navy Reserve medical officer. Pretty Little Liars star Torrey DeVitto was cast on August 13, 2015, as Dr. Natalie Manning, the ED pediatrician. On August 14, 2015, Rachel DiPillo was cast as Sarah Reese, a fourth year medical student. On April 13, 2016, it was announced that Jeff Hephner would reprise his Chicago Fire role as Jeff Clarke, however he has swapped professions and is now a fourth-year med student.

Crossovers
A three-way crossover between Chicago Fire, Chicago Med and Chicago P.D. aired on January 5 and 6, 2016.

Ratings

Home media
The DVD release of season one was released in Region 1 on August 30, 2016.

References

External links
 
 

2015 American television seasons
2016 American television seasons
Chicago Med seasons